The J.League Championship is a two-legged championship series which determined the season champion for the first 12 J.League seasons (1993–2004) excluding the 1996 season. In the early years, the J.League seasons were divided into two halves, the first and second stages, and the champions of each stage participated in the series. The competition did not take place in 1996, since the single season format was used in that year. Japanese beer company Suntory sponsored the championship, thus the name Suntory Championship was used in the media and among the general public.

As mentioned, the winners of this competition became the champions of the respective season, while the finalist became the runners-up.  As for the rest of the table, points from both stages were summed up to rank the clubs from 3rd place down.  In 2000, this format created an unusual situation where the 3rd place club, Kashiwa Reysol, had more points than both the season champion and runners-up in the final standing.

The series usually took place at the beginning of December, with the exception of the 1993 season, when it was held, due to the 1993 World Cup Qualifiers, in January.

The league adopted a single season format starting with the 2005 season. The J.League Championship returned for the 2015 season and 2016 season in a heavily modified format to previous incarnations.

Results
The winners are in bold.
Venues are indicated in brackets after the score line.

Clubs who won the most points through a season
There are only two occurrences where the club that won the most points in the season also won the championship. They are the 1993 and 1994 seasons, both won by Verdy Kawasaki. The following table shows the clubs that won the most points through a season.

In the 2000 season, although Kashiwa Reysol won the most points through the season, they could not take part in the J.League Championship because they failed to win either stage. In fact, Júbilo Iwata also won more points through the season than Yokohama F. Marinos and Kashima Antlers who qualified for the Championship. According to the regulation, the official league rankings of Kashiwa and Iwata of that season are third and fourth respectively.

Suntory Cup '96 J.League Champions' Finals
As the 1996 season wasn't divided into stages, the J.League Championship did not take place. Instead, the competition titled the Suntory Cup '96 J.League Champions' Finals was held. The champions and runners-up of the 1996 J.League regular season as well as the finalists of the J.League Cup took part. Nagoya Grampus Eight won and qualified for the 1997 Sanwa Bank Cup.

Participating clubs
 Kashima Antlers (J.League champions)
 Nagoya Grampus Eight (J.League runners-up) 
 Shimizu S-Pulse (J.League Cup winners)
 Verdy Kawasaki (J.League Cup runners-up)

Results

Meiji Yasuda 2015 J.League Championship
The Championship stage consisted of a knockout tournament involving the champions of the First and Second Stages, and any team that finishes in the top 3 of the overall table. The team with the best aggregate record earned a bye to the final. The remaining teams playoff for the other spot in the final.

Meiji Yasuda 2016 J.League Championship

References

See also
Japanese football champions
Apertura and Clausura for a general explanation of the format

Championship
Football competitions in Japan